Hrvoje "Cveba" Horvat (born 16 December 1977) is a Croatian retired handball player and current coach of the HSG Wetzlar.

Early life
Born in the family of mother Dunja and father Hrvoje Horvat, a former handballer and the gold medalist from the 1972 Summer Olympics in Munich, the younger Hrvoje finished primary and secondary school in his native Bjelovar, while in Zagreb he graduated from the University of Zagreb's Faculty of Kinesiology.

Playing career
Horvat started playing handball at ORK Partizan from Bjelovar, where his first coach was Krunoslav "Kuna" Turković. Later he played for RK Zagreb and RK Dubrava, with short stints in Switzerland and Germany. He was a member of national teams of whole age categories under the Croatian Handball Federation, including several appearances for the senior team.

In addition to indoor handball, Horvat also played beach handball, being a member of the senior Croatian national team, with which he won the World Championship in Spain and several gold medals from European championships.

Coaching career
After holding the position of player-coach at RK Dubrava until 2012, Horvat started his indoor handball coaching career in the same club in the same year. After saving Dubrava from relegation from the Croatian First League, he led the club to the placement in the final of the 2014 Croatian Cup, which they lost to powerhouse RK Zagreb.

In November 2016 Horvat was appointed head coach of RK Nexe Našice, which he led to secure a spot in the final four of the SEHA League in the 2018–19 season and previously won a place in the 2018–19 EHF Cup.

After Lino Červar became head coach of the Croatia men's national handball team in March 2017, Horvat was appointed his assistant. As a member of his coaching staff he participated in European championships in 2018 and 2020, and in World championships in 2019 and 2021. Following the latter tournament where Croatia finished in 15th place, Červar resigned and Horvat was appointed his successor as head coach of the Croatia men's national handball team.

Personal life
His nickname, like his father Hrvoje, is Cveba, which is the Croatian word for raisin.

Hrvoje Horvat Jr. has two older sisters, Jasenka and Vanja. Jasenka is the widow of the famous handball player, Iztok Puc, and Vanja is the ex-wife of former footballer and now football manager, Zoran Mamić. Horvat's mother, Dunja, passed away in March 2020 from Alzheimer's disease.

Honours

Coach
RK Dubrava
Croatian Cup runner-up: 2014

References

External links
Hrvoje Horvat at eurohandball.com

1977 births
Living people
Croatian male handball players
Croatian handball coaches
Sportspeople from Bjelovar
Handball coaches of international teams